Clyde Lee Giles is an American computer scientist and the David Reese Professor at the College of Information Sciences and Technology at the Pennsylvania State University. He is also Graduate Faculty Professor of Computer Science and Engineering, Courtesy Professor of Supply Chain and Information Systems, and Director of the Intelligent Systems Research Laboratory. He was Interim Associate Dean of Research. His graduate degrees are from the University of Michigan and the University of Arizona and his undergraduate degrees are from Rhodes College and the University of Tennessee. His PhD is in optical sciences with advisor Harrison H. Barrett. His academic genealogy includes two Nobel laureates (Felix Bloch and Werner Heisenberg), Arnold Sommerfeld and prominent mathematicians.

Research
Giles has been associated with the computer science or electrical engineering departments at Princeton University, the University of Pennsylvania, Columbia University, the University of Pisa, the University of Trento and the University of Maryland, College Park. Previous positions were at NEC Research Institute (now NEC Labs), Princeton, NJ; Air Force Research Laboratory; and the United States Naval Research Laboratory. He is best known for his work on the creation of novel scientific and academic search engines and digital libraries and is considered by some one of the founders of academic document search. Earlier research was concerned with recurrent neural networks and optical computing.

His research interests are in intelligent web and cyberinfrastructure tools, search engines and information retrieval, digital libraries, web services, knowledge and information management and extraction, machine learning, and information and data mining. He has created several vertical search engines in these areas. He has over 500 publications with some in Nature, Science and the Proceedings of the National Academy of Sciences. His research is well cited with an h-index of 113 according to Google Scholar and over 55,000 total citations as evidenced in Google Scholar.  He has one of the top 200 h-indexes in Computer Science and the top 10 in Information Retrieval. At Penn State he has graduated 36 PHD students.
Most of his papers author his name as C. Lee Giles or C.L. Giles.

Awards
He is a Fellow of the Association for Computing Machinery (ACM), Institute of Electrical and Electronics Engineers (IEEE), and International Neural Networks Society, INNS. He also received the Gabor Award from the International Neural Network Society recognizing achievements in engineering/applications in neural networks.  Most recently he received the 2018 Institute of Electrical and Electronics Engineers (IEEE) Computational Intelligence Society (CIS) Neural Networks Pioneer Award and the 2018 National Federation of Advanced Information Services (NFAIS) Miles Conrad Award.

He has twice received the IBM Distinguished Faculty Award.

Electromagnetics

Before his work on neural networks, Giles published papers on reflection and scattering of electromagnetic waves from magnetic materials for the particular cases of equal refractive indexes. His work is mentioned in the following articles: Fresnel equations, Mie scattering, and  Brewster's angle. For Mie scattering, he is a coauthor on the Kerker effect, which was an extension of his work on a planar boundary effect and his idea.

Neural networks
Giles' work on neural networks showed that fundamental computational structures such as regular grammars and finite state machines could be theoretically represented in recurrent neural networks. Another contribution was the Neural Network Pushdown Automata and the first analog differentiable stack. Some of these publications are cited as early work in "deep" learning.

CiteSeer and search engines
In 1998 and 1999 his work published in Science and Nature with Steve Lawrence estimated the size of the web and showed that search engines did not index that much of it. This work also showed that the web had significantly matured and had a diversity of material and resources.

With Steve Lawrence and Kurt Bollacker, Giles was responsible for the creation in 1997 of automatic citation indexing and CiteSeer, a public academic search engine and digital library for Computer and Information Science. Under his direction CiteSeer was moved to and is being maintained at the Pennsylvania State University. CiteSeer has been replaced by the Next Generation CiteSeer, CiteSeerX.

He is the director of the Next Generation CiteSeer project, CiteSeerX, also at the Pennsylvania State University. In addition, he was responsible for the creation of an academic business search engine and digital library, BizSeer (previously known as SmealSearch). With Isaac Councill, he created automatic acknowledgement indexing, permitting for the first time the automatic search and indexing of acknowledged entities in scholarly and research documents. The search engine for this was AckSeer. He also was the cocreator of the first search engine for robots.txt, BotSeer.

Research in collaboration with Professors Prasenjit Mitra, Karl Mueller, Barbara Garrison and James Kubicki resulted in the development of a search engine and data portal for chemistry, ChemxSeer, ChemXSeer. With Yang Sun, a novel search engine, BotSeer, was designed that searches and indexes robots.txt files on web sites. The Next Generation CiteSeer, CiteSeerx, came online in February 2008, with over one million articles indexed and now with active crawling exceeds 10 million articles. RefSeerX was a context-aware citation recommendation service which recommended papers from CiteSeerX that are most relevant to a given text. These services were based on SeerSuite, a package of open sources tools for searching and indexing academic documents and data.

Expert witness

Giles has been an expert witness for Quinn Emanuel Urquhart & Sullivan, LLP and Davis Polk & Wardwell, LLP representing Google and Yahoo.

References

External links
Pennsylvania State University profile page
Google Scholar page

Year of birth missing (living people)
Living people
Pennsylvania State University faculty
American computer scientists
Fellow Members of the IEEE
Fellows of the Association for Computing Machinery
University of Arizona alumni
University of Michigan alumni
University of Tennessee alumni
Rhodes College alumni